Thomas John Smith (born 2 September 1990) is an Australian politician. He has been the Labor Party member for Bundaberg in the Queensland Legislative Assembly since 2020.

Before his election, Smith was a secondary school teacher.

References

1990 births
Living people
Members of the Queensland Legislative Assembly
Australian Labor Party members of the Parliament of Queensland
21st-century Australian politicians